Toronto-Dominion Square, originally Oxford Square, is a full-block building complex in Calgary, Alberta built by Oxford Developments. The project was designed by Skidmore, Owings & Merrill of New York, with J. H. Cook and Associates as the architect of record. It is located on the block between 7 and 8 Avenues South and 2 and 3 Streets West. The structure consists of a five-storey base with two 35-storey towers. The south tower is named for the Home Oil Company and the north tower is named for Dome Petroleum. The base includes a large botanical garden called the Devonian Gardens. In 1980, SOM replicated the design concept in its Town Square in Saint Paul, Minnesota.

Designed by CPV Group Architects and Engineers Ltd in late modernist style, it was built by PCL Construction and was completed in 1977. The building is managed by Cushman and Wakefield.

Devonian Gardens is a large indoor park and botanical garden located in the downtown core of Calgary, Alberta, Canada. In 2012 a major $37-million renovation was completed. It is maintained by The City of Calgary Parks.

The gardens include a living wall, koi ponds, fountains, a children's play area, and over 550 trees, as well as meeting/function space for special events. A full-service restaurant is also planned.

Opened in 1977, Devonian Gardens was designed by J.H. Cook Architects and Engineers and donated to the City of Calgary by the Devonian Group of Charitable Foundations and Calford Properties. The construction cost was 9 million dollars.

The original gardens contained more than 20,000 plants representing 135 tropical and local species, decorated with waterfalls, bridges, koi ponds and sculptures by local artists, showcased as a permanent art exhibition.

A major redevelopment of The Core Shopping Centre (formerly TD Square) beneath the park began in 2008, requiring the gardens to close for renovations for 4 years. The changes include a wider, taller circulation space in the mall below and installation of a 3-block long, continuous skylight above. The gardens reopened on June 27, 2012, and features additional seating for the CORE food court, a playground and space for corporate events.

In 2016 it had to be closed again to repair persistent leaks.

References

Buildings and structures in Calgary
Skyscrapers in Calgary
Buildings and structures completed in 1977
Modernist architecture in Canada
Skyscraper office buildings in Canada